Gert Spaargaren (born February, 1954) is a Dutch professor at the Wageningen University, author, and editor. Spaargaren is from Aalsmeer, Netherlands, and is currently teaching Environmental Policy for sustainability and patterns of consumption in the Department of Social Sciences. His fields of expertise are Consumer Studies and Environmental policy.

Education

Spaargaren attended Hermann Wesselink College in Amstelveen in 1973, and later studied the science of plant diseases at Wageningen University until 1977. In 1983, he earned his PhD in Sociology from Wageningen. Spaargaren served that year as a project researcher at Ecumenical Study in Action Center Investments and at Pax Christi, Utrecht, in Amsterdam.

Career
He began his career at Wareningen University in Netherlands in June 1985. Between 1999 and 2003, Spaargaren held a professorship at Tilburg University, teaching policy of environmental education. In 1999 he completed his dissertation on the ecological modernization of production and consumption at Wageningen University. Spaargaren has been Senior Lecturer in Environmental Sociology and Policy at the Environmental Policy Group since 1999. Spaargaren's teachings are focused on environmental policy for sustainability and patterns of consumption in the Department of Social Sciences. He has worked with authors David A. Sonnenfeld, Arthur P.J. Mol, Peter Oosterveer, and Anne Loeber.

He is and active member in the Climate NL, Platform Climate Research, Netherlands. The environmental Policy Group and Horizon 2020 are part of the Wargeningen Research Team. To date, he has 19 endorsers for his Environmental research.

In 2000 Spaargaren wrote "Governing Environmental Flows: Global Challenges to Social Theory."

Published works
A partial list of Spaargaren's published works is:
 "Eco-teams: milieuverandering voor en achter de meter." (1995)
 "Governing Environmental Flows: Global Challenges to Social Theory" (2006)
 "Brug slaan naar gewone burger" (2005)
 "The laboratory of everyday life - The citizen-consumer as change-agent" (2010)

References

1954 births
Living people
Dutch sociologists
Dutch environmentalists
Dutch non-fiction writers
Environmental sociologists
Wageningen University and Research alumni
Academic staff of Wageningen University and Research
Academic staff of Tilburg University
People from Aalsmeer